Yuliya Beygelzimer and Margarita Gasparyan were the defending champions, but Gasparyan chose to participate in Rome instead. Beygelzimer partnered Misa Eguchi, but lost in the first round.

Anna Kalinskaya and Tereza Mihalíková won the title, defeating Evgeniya Rodina and Anastasija Sevastova in the final, 6–1, 7–6(7–4).

Seeds

Draw

References 
 Draw

Empire Slovak Open - Doubles